The following is a list of the characters in the Ice Age films, mentioned by a name either presented in the films or in any other official material. Each character includes a summary when possible, the voice actor or actors associated with the character, and a description of the character along with any aliases, spouses and the character's species.

The Herd

Manny

Manfred "Manny", is a woolly mammoth in all five Ice Age films. His personality is shown to be aloof, grumpy, sarcastic and standoffish, but is otherwise loving and courageous. In the first film, while passing through the icy cave, the herd discovers cave paintings of Manny with his wife and son, who were killed by humans; this is a very sentimental moment for Manny, since he failed to protect them. Manny finds love with Ellie in Ice Age: The Meltdown. In Ice Age: Dawn of the Dinosaurs, he is anxious when Ellie is pregnant. At the end of the film, he becomes the proud father of a baby daughter named Peaches. In Ice Age: Continental Drift, he gets into an argument with his teenage daughter before being pulled away in by the drift with Diego, Sid and Granny. He and the team later encounter a group of pirates led by Captain Gutt. When the team escaped they destroy the ship and take Shira with them. This enrages the Captain who hunts them down. Later on, he is almost manipulated by sirens.

A running gag for Manny, shown in four of the five films, is that if a certain character were to refer to him as fat, he would often deny it, saying that "his fur is what makes him look big" and that "it's poofy".

Sid

Sidney "Sid" is a ground sloth in all five films who is dull-witted, talkative, friendly, carefree, naive, accident-prone, patient and funny with a caring nature, and is voiced with a lateral lisp. Little is known from Sid's life other than that Sid once lived in a tree with other sloths that always wanted to leave Sid behind when the migration occurred, using several different ways to leave him behind. What is clear is that Sid's mother always told him that "bad news is just good news in disguise" before abandoning him for good. He accidentally starts a fire in the first film and learns how to do it properly towards the end; he also shows this skill in the second film, where he is worshiped by a tribe of "mini-sloths" who call him "Fire King" and try to sacrifice him. In the third film, he adopts a trio of baby T-Rexes, and is forcibly taken to the underground dinosaur land by their mother, requiring the others to come and save him. In the fourth film, it is revealed that his full name is Sidney, though this name was also used in a deleted scene of the first film. When he, Diego and Manny are on the ice and are forced up by a water spout, they see a rainbow in the bright blue sky as he told them that "there is a rainbow at the end of every corner."

A mechanical version of Sid appears in Robots during the miming scene.

Sid was built along the form typical of ground sloths, short, brushy tail, clawed hands and feet, a long thin neck, ovular head with bulbous eye on both sides and a pair of buckteeth. Sid's right front tooth was slightly bigger than the left, similar to his right eye, which was also somewhat bigger than the left, both eyes of which were pale green. Sid's pelt was dirty and tan, and became brown when the fungus it carried dried out, Sid attributing the state of his pelt to his vegetarian diet, which he said led to a younger-looking pelt.

In the behind the scenes, the creators combined the traits of three-toed sloths and ground sloths while designing Sid and the other sloth characters.

Diego

Diego is a Smilodon found in all five of the films. He is Shira's love interest. He has a sardonic personality, although it is not intended to be nasty. He was sent by his pack to retrieve the human baby called Roshan; When he found Roshan in Manny and Sid's care, he pretended to lead them to the humans, but instead planned to lead them into an ambush by the pack. However, when Manny saved his life, Diego had a change of heart, confessing about the pack and sacrifices himself to help them escape. He was left for dead when the pack's leader, Soto, wounded him in an attack meant for Manny but he survived and joined Manny and Sid on their travels. In the second film, he was revealed to suffer from aquaphobia, but he eventually conquered it in order to save Sid, Crash and Eddie. In the third film, he began to fear that he was losing his predatory abilities from being in the "herd" too long, and considered staying in the underground dinosaur world with Buck. He changed his mind after managing to save the labored Ellie from a dinosaur attack. In Ice Age: Continental Drift, another Smilodon named Shira joins the group, and Diego feels attracted to her. During the end credits, Diego and Shira are seen nuzzling each other showing that they have now become a couple.

Ellie

Ellie is a female woolly mammoth, whom Manny, Diego, and Sid meet during their migration to escape the flood in the second movie, Ice Age: The Meltdown. She thinks she is a possum, as she was raised by Crash's and Eddie's mother when she was a calf, until she accepts the truth about what she really is, and joins the herd with her adoptive brothers.

In Ice Age: Dawn of the Dinosaurs, she and Manny are mates and Ellie is pregnant with their first child. When they find the Dinosaur World under their feet, they have to go in and search for Sid in Lava Falls. Despite being pregnant, she bravely went on the journey, and at one point had to save her mate and friends when they were trapped in the chasm of death. When very close to Lava Falls, Ellie goes into labour, and, with Diego's help, gives birth to a healthy female calf. She comes up with the name Peaches (who was named after the codeword that was used if Ellie went into labor on the trip) and Manny happily agrees. When they reunite with Sid and return to the surface, Ellie introduces Peaches to the herd's new home.

In Ice Age: Continental Drift, she is an understanding wife and mother. Unlike her husband, Ellie recognises that her daughter is growing up and supports both Manny and Peaches when they argue. When the continental breakup happens she leads an evacuation route to the Land Bridge. She is briefly held hostage by the evil Captain Gutt and his pirate crew but is rescued by her family and she fights the pirates alongside them.

Crash and Eddie

Crash and Eddie are two twin brother opossums. Adoptive brothers of Ellie, they cared for her and taught her to hang by her tail from a tree branch when she slept, as they did. They are shown to be adventurous and fun-loving, courtesy of the fact that they're both very stupid. Though they are around the same age as Ellie, they are not nearly as mature.

In the third film, Crash and Eddie travel with the others to the dino jungle to save Sid from Momma, and both grow to idolize Buck, the one-eyed dinosaur-hunting weasel who helped them find Sid. They also mention they never liked Sid. This is not true however (as they were at the time being affected by the gas within the "Chasm of Dead"), due to helping Buck save Sid from his incoming death. Crash and Eddie, along with Buck, ride a pterosaur and save Sid from a lava flow heading downwards.

In Ice Age: Continental Drift, they have more minor roles than in the previous films but do partake in the final battle with Gutt's crew fighting Dobson by hopping on his back and having a rodeo, but accidentally let him charge into Manny and, later Shira, knocking them onto the other ship.

Peaches

Peaches is the daughter of Manny and Ellie, born in the Dinosaurs' world whilst they were under attack by a pack of Guanlong. She appeared close to end of Ice Age: Dawn of the Dinosaurs. At the end of the film, she returned to the surface with her parents and the rest of the group. She is voiced by Ciara Bravo in Ice Age: A Mammoth Christmas as a kid, and Keke Palmer in Ice Age: Continental Drift as a teenager, and also as a young adult in Ice Age: Collision Course.

Peaches appears as a teenager in Ice Age: Continental Drift. She is self-taught to do some possum moves just like her mother. In Ice Age: Collision Course, Peaches is now a young adult and prepares to marry a male mammoth named Julian.

She does not appear in The Ice Age Adventures of Buck Wild.

Granny

Gladys "Granny" is a Megalonyx and also Sid's grandmother. She joins the herd after her own family abandons her. She had an allegedly imaginary pet named Precious, which showed up at the end and turned out to be real: a giant whale who defeats Gutt's crew (minus Squint) by blasting them away.

In Ice Age: Continental Drift, Precious helped the group to Switchback Cove and Granny bids her pet a fond good-bye.

Louis

Louis appears in Ice Age: Continental Drift as Peaches' best friend. He is a timid, well-spoken, and cute molehog (a portmanteau of mole and hedgehog). He is shown to have a crush on Peaches.

Louis makes a small cameo in Ice Age: Collision Course.

Shira

Shira appears in Ice Age: Continental Drift as part of Gutt's crew, and is Captain Gutt's pawn. She is a dazzlingly beautiful, female Smilodon and Diego's lover resembling a white tiger. She makes her first appearance in Scrat's Continental Crack-up: Part 2 standing next to Captain Gutt, who is holding Scrat. It is also mentioned that (much like Diego) Shira left her pack to join Gutt's crew. Over the course of the film, however, Shira ultimately chooses to leave Gutt's crew, and join the Herd at Diego's side.

In Ice Age: Collision Course, she is now married to Diego and wants to start a family with him.

She is completely absent from The Ice Age Adventures of Buck Wild without explanation or mention.

Julian

Julian is a young and courageous mammoth who is Peaches' fiancé and part-time member of The Herd and The Brat Pack. Julian may be somewhat absent-minded, but is devoted and caring toward Peaches, and wants to be part of her family.

Brooke

Brooke is a British Megalonyx living in Geotopia who becomes Sid's love interest and new girlfriend. She appears in Ice Age: Collision Course.

It is not known what becomes of the relationship after her appearance in the film, as she is neither seen nor mentioned in The Ice Age Adventures of Buck Wild.

Scrat

Scrat is a saber-toothed squirrel in all five of the Ice Age films who is obsessed with collecting acorns, constantly putting his life in danger to obtain and defend them. He has his own stories in the films which are mostly independent of those of the main characters, though the two do intersect at times.

Appearing in Ice Age

Roshan

Roshan, or "Pinky" as what Manny called him, is the Neanderthal baby that Manny, Sid, and Diego return to his father.

He is the young son of a Neanderthal tribal chief. While sleeping one morning, his tribe is attacked by a pack of smilodons. The leader of the pack, Soto, wants to kill the baby as revenge for the baby's father killing half the pack and using their skin for clothes and their flesh for food. His mother is able to fend off Diego, whose mission is to retrieve him. However, she is cornered over a waterfall. In a desperate attempt to save her son, leaps over the waterfall, holding the baby tightly in her arms. They are both found by Manny and Sid at the riverside. Using what little strength she has left, she gives the baby to Manny and Sid in hopes that he will be safe with them.

Soto's Pack
Soto's Pack are a group of saber-toothed cats in Ice Age. They targeted Roshan as revenge on his tribe of Neanderthals because half of their pack was killed by them and used to make their clothes. Diego was formerly of this group before he defected to Manny and Sid's side.

Soto

Soto is a violent and sadistic Smilodon who is the leader of a pack of saber-toothed cats. He wants to eat Roshan in vengeance for the murders of several of his pack-mates.

As part of his plan to kidnap Roshan, Soto plans an attack on the human camp so that while he and three other pack members would attack the humans, Diego would sneak in, unnoticed, and abduct Roshan. Diego fails at this task, leaving Soto furious, telling Diego to bring Roshan to Half-Peak where he would meet with the others and threatens have him served as a replacement if he fails. Soto dispatched his fellow pack members Zeke and Oscar to warn Diego to hurry and bring Roshan or not return at all, though was reciprocated with the news that alongside Roshan, Soto would receive a mammoth. During the final battle, Soto was sent flying into the side of a cliff where he was killed offscreen by the falling icicles.

Zeke

Zeke is an overactive Smilodon and a member of Soto's pack.

Oscar

Oscar is a tall Smilodon and a member of Soto's pack.

Lenny

Lenny is a rotund Homotherium and a member of Soto's pack.

Lenny, along with the rest of the pack, attacked the human encampment but were fended off by the humans' dogs who fought alongside the humans against the pack sending them off. One of the pack members Diego was expected to steal the baby Roshan from the humans but missed his chance when Roshan's mother Nadia escaped with her child through a waterfall. Bitter at Diego's failure the pack leader Soto orders Diego to retrieve Roshan and bring him to Half Peak where the others will be waiting. Soto was later informed by other pack members Zeke and Oscar that Diego will bring Roshan back along with a wooly Mammoth called Manny who has been caring for Roshan along with Sid the sloth.

Unlike the rest of his pack who are all saber-toothed cats, Lenny is a scimitar-toothed cat as stated in the book Ice Age: The Essential Guide.

Runar

Runar was the chieftain of the Neanderthal tribe shown in the first film.

Runar was a leader for a tribe of Neanderthals (referred in the film as humans). He was the father of Roshan and husband of Nadia, and cared greatly for his family, all the while leading them and the rest of the tribe as a nomadic group to travel from place to place.

Nadia

Nadia was the wife of the chieftain of a neanderthal tribe shown in the first film.

Nadia had a husband named Runar and a baby son named Roshan. She and her family lived a peaceful life together with their tribe until the day when a pack of saber-toothed tigers invaded their camp to abduct the youngest member Roshan in revenge for the tribe killing half of their pack. Nadia fended off an attack on Roshan long enough to run away quickly from Diego who was pursuing her.

The Dodo Birds
These dodos are portrayed as greedy for watermelons claiming it to be their private stockpile for the ice age. All these dodos hate to be extinct. While the dodos in the first film met with unfortunate outcomes, other dodo flocks appeared in later films.

Dab

Dab was the head dodo shown in the first film.

Carl and Frank

Carl and Frank are an Embolotherium and a Brontops respectively. Carl had thick lips and a thick horn, while Frank had more pointed lips and a thinner horn. They referred to Sid as an overgrown weasel, and soughtto kill him for his mischiefs, such as eating the last dandelion of the season, and entering their mud bath uninvited.

Jennifer and Rachel

Jennifer and Rachel are two Megalonyx from the first film.

The two were shown being sweet-talked by Sid to impress them while he had the baby Roshan in tow. Jennifer admitted that she found some of Sid's qualities to be most attractive, and when Sid left, the two spoke to each other on how, despite his lack of good looks, he was a family-type.

Sylvia

Sylvia is a female Megalonyx who was cut from the first film, but can be found in the deleted scenes of the 2-Disc DVD release as well as the film-to-book adaptation.

Sylvia was cut from the movie fairly late. Most of her scenes were completely animated and rendered, and she was seen in the first few trailers of the movie as well as the initial posters.

Appearing in Ice Age: The Meltdown

Fast Tony

A Holmesina living in the days of the Ice Age, Fast Tony was a peddler trying to give off items such as reeds and bark to other denizens of the Ice Age so as to escape the world's end, which by chance, he predicted and it came true. Fast Tony would give off products in exchange for whatever the other animals would bring by with the help of his "assistant", an insipid glyptodon named Stu. He was notoriously amoral with others, even being criticized by Manny for willing to sell off "his own mother for a grape". Fast Tony immediately asked if that was an offer, then pretended he had not thought of it for the benefit of the watching animals.

Stu was more Fast Tony's guinea pig to prove their wares' worth, rather than his actual partner and proved more useful dead than alive, as Fast Tony had taken Stu's shell (as Stu had just been killed by Maelstrom and Cretaceous) and shamelessly tried to pawn it off to other animals as a personal "mobile home".

Fast Tony was last seen at the end of Ice Age: The Meltdown using Stu's shell as a raft.

Stu

Stu was a Glyptodon who was Fast Tony's partner. He seemed to be disliked by Tony due to his stupid personality. He assisted Fast Tony to warn the valley that the dam of ice would burst and helped to demonstrate Fast Tony's snorkel. After the revelation of the flood was proved to be true, Stu took the test snorkel and used it to swim underwater. Shortly after scaring James, a young anteater, Stu was grabbed and pulled underwater by an unknown attacker. As the other animals begin to leave, Fast Tony returns to the pool to get Stu to come along, but Stu's shell is suddenly spat out of the water by the unknown assailant. Fast Tony, after looking at the shell, sees that it makes a great mobile home and runs off after the other animals to try and unload it on someone. Meanwhile, the unknown attackers turn out to be the marine reptiles Cretaceous and Maelstrom. In the ending after the flood, Fast Tony is discovered to have been using the shell as a boat, but he leaves the shell behind as he no longer needs it.

Mr. and Mrs. Start

Mr. and Mrs. Start are two Starts that are shown resting at the Glacier Water Park where they complain about the heat. During this conversation, the ice that Mrs. Start was on cracked and she fell into the water.

The Lone Gunslinger

The Lone Gunslinger is a Teratornis.

The Lone Gunslinger arrives to confirm Manny's suspicions to the animals at Glacier Water Park that the ice dam will break. He acts as the voice that warns the other animals of the dangers coming soon due to the valley where they reside flooding up with water and that there is a "boat" at the other end of the valley that can save them. The Lone Gunslinger only warns them of the danger and little else, rather hoping that one or two of the animals leaving will die, furnishing food for him and the other Teratornis which he is presumably family and friends with. As he watches all of the creatures in the valley leave to safety, he makes cryptic statements with his Teratornis friends about it and this escalates to the point of singing a cover to "Food Glorious Food". The Lone Gunslinger was last shown with his flock flying over the "boat" full of escaping animals and making provocative remarks like mentioning that all unattended children will be eaten.

In the storybook version, he and his fellow Teratornis were shown to be feasting on Cretaceous and Maelstrom's corpses.

Cretaceous

Cretaceous is a pliosaur.

Cretaceous is shown in the beginning frozen in a great block of ice that was jarred loose when the wall of ice began crumbling. The ice melted, releasing both him and Maelstrom into the lake which was all but abandoned by most animals. When they made it to the ice lake, the first animal that they had encountered and eaten was Stu, leaving behind only his shell. The two sea reptiles then swam further down the series of rivers where they eventually reached Manny's herd as well as Crash, Eddie, and Ellie. Cretaceous made a great lunge at Manny, but was caught on his tusks, only to be flung far off, hitting a piece of ice and falling back into the water.

Later, when the dam broke, the two reptiles went swimming on the wall of water that was slowly approaching towards the escaping masses and pulled down Manny when he was swimming to save Ellie. Manny devised a plan to rid himself of the two sea reptiles, by having them try to chase him, he tricked them into hitting a log that was wedged under a large rock. The plan worked, freeing Ellie, and the boulder falls on Cretaceous and Maelstrom, killing them.

In the storybook version, The Lone Gunslinger and his fellow Teratornis were shown to be feasting on Cretaceous and Maelstrom.

Cretaceous returns as a boss in the 2014 Ice Age Adventures video game which is set after the events of the fourth film. Nevertheless, his survival is still unexplained.

Maelstrom

Maelstrom is an Ichthyosaur.

Maelstrom is shown in the beginning frozen in a great block of ice that was jarred loose when the wall of ice began crumbling. The ice melted, releasing both Cretaceous and him into the lake which was all but abandoned by most animals. When they made it to the ice lake, the first animal that they had encountered and eaten was Stu, leaving behind only his shell. The two sea reptiles then swam further down the series of rivers where they eventually reached Manny's herd as well as Crash, Eddie, and Ellie. Maelstrom intended to eat Sid but could not catch him, as Sid was already escaping with Diego, and had only just escaped Maelstrom as he broke off a massive chunk of ice where the sloth and saber-tooth had stood only moments before.

Later, when the dam broke, the two reptiles went swimming on the wall of water that was slowly approaching towards the escaping masses and pulled down Manny when he was swimming to save Ellie. Manny devised a plan to rid himself of the two sea reptiles, by having them try to chase him, he tricked them into hitting a log that was wedged under a large rock. The plan worked, freeing Ellie and killing Cretaceous and Maelstrom.

In the storybook version, The Lone Gunslinger and his fellow Teratornis were shown to be feasting on Cretaceous and Maelstrom.

Piranhas

The number of Piranhas resided in the ice lakes of the waterpark, where they were pursued by flocks of Baptornis and scattered by other animals. The piranha, however, found potential prey in the form of Scrat that had fall in the lake. The piranhas bared their teeth and chased Scrat out of the water onto an ice floe, one leaping out of the water and biting him on the paw; this paw was holding his prized acorn. Angry that something had attempted to take his acorn. Scrat seized another piranha and used it to hit at others, fighting and kicking the fish away, stunning them all. As one attempted to edge back to the water, Scrat stomped on its side, forcing it to release an acorn that is held.

In Ice Age 3, a school of piranha met a baby Tyrannosaurus (one of Momma's babies that had been kidnapped by Sid) and bared their teeth at it. The young Tyrannosaurus bared his own teeth and frightened the fish off.

Mini-Sloths

A tribe of Mini Sloths are smaller sloths who worship Sid and call him "Fire King". Immediately afterwards, they try to throw him into lava, believing that they can avert the flood by sacrificing him. However, he escapes. They later appear after the flood.

Ashley

Ashley is a minor beaver/horned gopher character in the second film. In her appearance, she treats Sid like a piñata and appears to be a ringleader among the kids.

Appearing in Ice Age: Dawn of the Dinosaurs

Scratte

Scratte (pronounced "Scrat-tay") is a seductive female saber-toothed flying squirrel that makes her debut in Ice Age: Dawn of the Dinosaurs. She is seen in the second trailer with Scrat battling with her for the acorn by propelling themselves down a gorge to reach the fallen acorn, and succeeding. Scratte is also seen as a love interest for Scrat.

Scratte's personality traits have been shown to be flirtatious, feisty, and intelligent. She is equally determined in catching the acorn and uses her feminine wiles to her advantage. She doesn't, however, seem to be nearly as obsessed with acorns as her male counterpart, as she was shown trying to destroy the acorn at the end of the film out of jealousy. Scratte will often injure and manipulate Scrat in the process of retrieving it. However, her attraction to him is implied and fully emerged when he saved her from falling into lava.

In the fourth movie, Scratte appeared again in a cameo role as a Siren only to then be dismissed by a disinterested Scrat. In addition, tons of her species live on Scratlantis.

Buck

Buckminster "Buck" Wild is a weasel that makes an appearance in Ice Age: Dawn of the Dinosaurs. He is missing his right eye and wears a leaf as an impromptu eyepatch, as well as having a scar on one of his ears and seems slightly insane (he claims that he woke up one day, married to an ugly pineapple, but he still loved "her", and Manny calls him a "deranged hermit." He also claims to have sadly been "killed by Rudy," although he was not). According to the official website, Buck is one-eyed and relentless in his hunting for dinosaurs. Buck's archenemy is a large albino Baryonyx he calls Rudy, who gouged out Buck's eye and attempted to eat him, but failed after Buck grabbed onto to Rudy's uvula, swung on it, and then let go, knocking out Rudy's teeth, which he kept and later sharpened into a knife that he carries with him. Buck is the only inhabitant of the dinosaurs' world who does not fear Rudy in the slightest, though he possesses a deep respect for him. Due to living underground for so long, he has an extensive knowledge of the dangers of the dinosaur world.

Buck first meets Manny, Crash, Eddie, Diego, and Ellie (who he at one point refers to as "preggers") after they descend into the jungle in pursuit of Sid and Momma, and saves them from a dinosaur attack. He has been living in the jungle for quite some time, persistently hunting Rudy to avenge the loss of his eye, and agrees to lead them to Lava Falls, where Momma has taken Sid, and rescues him after taking control of a Harpactognathus.

After Rudy's potential death, Buck, having lost his purpose in life, decides to join the herd and live on the surface. Upon hearing a distant familiar roar that tells him that Rudy survived the fall, he chooses to stay and causes a cave-in that seals off the path between the surface and the underground jungle, trapping him inside and everyone else on the surface. He and Rudy proceed to continue their battle.

Buck and Rudy make brief cameos in Scrat's Continental Crack-up and Ice Age: Continental Drift when Scrat falls through the Earth and passes them.

He returns to help the herd with an ancient stone pillar and rejoins them to stop the asteroid in Ice Age: Collision Course while being pursued by a family of Dino-Birds.

Due to being voiced by Simon Pegg, Buck speaks with a British accent.

Pegg was the only original voice actor from the films to reprise his role in The Ice Age Adventures of Buck Wild where Buck encounters Crash and Eddie again when they enter the Lost World.

Momma

Momma was a female Tyrannosaurus. She took Sid from his herd when he took her eggs from her. She brings Sid to Lava Falls and the two compete to see who can care for her babies better. Sid loses, but is allowed to stay. However, they are separated later and Sid is attacked by Rudy. She is also called Momzilla by Sid.

Momma later returns when Manny, Ellie, Diego, Sid, Crash, Eddie, and Buck are under attack by Rudy and knocks Rudy off a cliff to his apparent death proceeding to bid Sid farewell.

Momma makes an appearance in The Ice Age Adventures of Buck Wild where Buck and Zee enlist her to help fight Orson's raptor army. Though they had a setback with dealing with her bad tooth and Zee being unable to wake her. After waking up and making her way to the water hole as instructed, Momma runs into Manny, Sid, Diego, and Ellie where she also helps in fighting the raptor army.

Rudy

Rudy is a gigantic albino Baryonyx in the third film who is feared by all the creatures in the valley except Buck and Momma. When Buck first arrived in the jungle, he was attacked by Rudy, who scratched him in the right eye, thus poking it out, and very nearly devoured him. Buck escaped, knocking out one of Rudy's teeth in the process. Rudy appears to have held a grudge ever since, especially since the impact left behind a crack in his mouth which prevented any new teeth from growing. Rudy first appears when he attacks Sid and chases him onto a rock floating over Lava Falls, and later attacks Sid and company full force as they are about to exit the jungle. The group quickly proves to be no match for the Baryonyx, but are saved by Momma, who knocks him off of a cliff. Rudy survives, however, and he and Buck continue their eternal war. Rudy is last seen roaring in frustration as Buck is riding on top of the massive dinosaur laughing, as Rudy runs through the jungle.

Buck and Rudy made a brief cameo in the following film Ice Age: Continental Drift.

Note: Rudy is constantly mistaken for a Spinosaurus. Although he has features of both species that make him appear to be a hybrid of both dinosaurs, the filmmakers have directly stated he is a Baryonyx.

Johnny

Johnny is a young aardvark who is swallowed whole and alive by Egbert. Johnny's mother demands that Sid, currently posing as the young dinosaurs' father orders the dinosaur to return her son or else they will leave the playground. Johnny was not found just then; instead a young Gastornis, named Madison, is brought up. But then Manny and Ellie come by. Egbert got scared, and immediately regurgitated Johnny. His mother promptly drags him off. He is referred to by Sid and his mother as "Little Johnny".

Johnny's Mother

The unnamed mother of Johnny. She looked on in horror when Egbert tried to eat little Johnny. She later demanded that Sid tell Egbert to spit her son out. Egbert seemed to comply, but instead spat out a young Diatryma named Madison to her annoyance. When Manny arrived on the scene, Egbert regurgitated Little Johnny in shock and his mother comforted him.

Gazelle

This unnamed Gazelle was shown being chased by Diego only for him to end up exhausted. The gazelle heckled him and ran off. The same gazelle later appeared running by Diego to escape the Tyrannosaurus while advising him to run.

Pudgy Beaver Mom

The unnamed Pudgy Beaver Mom is the mother of a young beaver. She was among the village of animals that reacted to Ellie's false alarm of her pregnancy. When Sid commented on the beaver mom's pregnancy, the beaver mom angrily tells Sid that she is not pregnant and snapped a stick to hit Sid with it. When the beaver mom's young child ventured into the playground that Manny had built, she called out Sid over the fact that the three Tyrannosaurus children were picking on her child. Sid tells her that he's a single parent.

Egbert, Yoko, and Shelly

These baby dinosaurs are three baby Tyrannosaurus from Ice Age: Dawn of the Dinosaurs, consisting of two males (Egbert and Yoko), and one female (Shelly). Sid took them away from their mother, but she came searching for them and took Sid away with them, then she later became friends with Sid at the end of the movie. They are very friendly dinosaurs, but due to being carnivores, they go too far in playing with other animals which eventually winds up with one of them eating a couple of the kids. Despite knowing that Sid isn't their real father, they still loved and care for him to a point of protecting him from their angry mother. They are later returned to their mother at the end of the film.

Roger

Roger is a Harpactognathus who was used by Buck, along with Crash and Eddie, to go to the Lava Falls to rescue Sid from Rudy. During the attempt, they were attacked by a flock of Cearadactylus, but they managed to evade them and rescue Sid in time. After returning to the Plates of Woe, the pterosaur flew away after Buck asked if it had "ever thought of settling down and starting a family".

Roger's gender is unspecified in the film, but it is referred to as a female in the video game adaption.

Other dinosaurs
Among the other dinosaurs that live in the underground valley are Ankylosaurus, Brachiosaurus, Kentrosaurus/Miragaia hybrids, Iguanodon, Troodon, Pachycephalosaurus, Triceratops, Archaeopteryx, Guanlong and the pterosaurs Harpactognathus and Quetzalcoatlus (the filmmakers refer to them as "pterodactyl" and "pterosaur" respectively). Also, the Dilophosaurus appears in the video game adaption where it has the same neck frill description as the version seen in the Jurassic Park franchise.

Appearing in Ice Age: Continental Drift

Captain Gutt's Pirates
A group of pirates that sailed the seas. Among its members are:

Captain Gutt

Gutt is a Gigantopithecus who is a self-styled master and cruel and ruthless pirate captain of the high seas. His name is based on the long sharpened fingernails that he uses to "gut" his enemies. He captures Manny, Sid, Diego, Scrat, and Granny and attempts to make them part of his crew. His friendly demeanor quickly vanishes when Manny refuses; he throws the mammoth and his friends overboard, and furiously vows revenge when they destroy his ship and bounty during their escape (he is failure intolerant).

Gutt enslaves a population of hyraxes to build a new ship for him, and also strips Shira of her rank as first mate when she reveals she did not kill Manny, giving her position to Squint. Gutt leads his crew to battle against the unenslaved hyraxes, only for the hyraxes to be revealed as a distraction while Manny steals his new ship. Enraged, Gutt quickly forges a new ship out of a wall of ice, propelled by his legion of narwhals. Gutt arrives at Manny's home, and takes Ellie, Peaches, and the other animals hostage.

Manny turns himself in to free his wife and daughter, but Gutt goes back on his word, stating that Manny took everything he had from him and the evil captain intended to do the same. However, the timely arrival of Louis, Peaches' friend, sparks a fierce battle between the pirates and Manny's herd. Gutt tries to fight Manny along with Raz, but Diego fights Gutt himself. Gutt chases Diego up a tree on the herd's ship, and knocks the sabertooth down with the rest of herd. Gutt corners the herd, but he and his pirates are defeated by Granny's pet whale Precious.

Gutt is swift enough to dodge Precious' blasts while Squint, Raz, Flynn, Dobson, Silas, and Gupta are knocked onto the side of their ship and into the sea; Gutt escapes and leaves his crew behind. He is about to kill Ellie when Peaches knocks him onto the back of the ice. He then leaps at Manny and refuses to let him return to his family. A new landmass emerges and launches the iceberg that the two are standing on into the air.

Gutt battles Manny with his two swords, stating that "the sea isn't big enough" for the two of them. Manny charges into Gutt, knocking him down, but Gutt is able to push the mammoth off of him. Manny charges again, but Gutt swings on a number of vines to catch up to the floe; Manny follows. Gutt pushes Manny onto the front of the floe and grabs a log to finish him off, but Manny jumps onto the back of the floe, which launches Gutt off the floe. Manny catches the log and hits Gutt, sending the evil ape flying out of fight.

He lands in a cave river and grabs a piece of ice to float on the water; he notices fins sticking out of the water, and is shortly after eaten offscreen by a siren posing as a female Gigantopithecus. However, he makes an appearance as a boss in the 2014 Ice Age Adventures video game, which is set after the events of the fourth film. This means that Gutt has somehow escaped the siren.

Note: Jeremy Renner was originally set to voice the character, but was replaced by Peter Dinklage due scheduling conflicts involving The Bourne Legacy. Captain Gutt was initially written as a bear, but designer Peter DeSève had a hard time designing an ursine villain, and thus instead designed him as a more versatile primate.. He is also modeled after the legendary pirate Blackbeard.

Flynn

Flynn is a large English elephant seal (appearing to be just as big as or even bigger than Manny in the film) who makes his first appearance in the second part of Scrat's Continental Crack-up. He provides the muscle of the crew. His lack of intelligence is the source of comic relief throughout the film. Flynn likes to eat fruit, and calls the song titled "Master of the Seas" a sea shanty. When the pirates first encounter Manny's herd, Flynn inadvertently gives them directions to return to the continent, much to Gutt's exasperation. The seal then joined the attack on the herd, squashing Sid underneath his bulk. When Manny's herd destroys the ship, leaving the pirates to drift at sea, Flynn initially panics at the prospect of drowning, but is reminded by an annoyed Gutt that he is able to swim. Flynn worries about Shira when Gutt leaves her for dead, but he later propels the pirates to land aboard a small raft made of ice.

In the final battle, Flynn and Gupta corner Sid and Granny, only for the latter to summon Precious, sending the pirates running in fear. Flynn rejoins the battle against Manny, but is defeated when Precious blasts him with water.

Raz

Raz is an Australian Procoptodon who serves as the crew's resident weapons and artillery expert, hiding an arsenal of deadly bone swords in her pouch and using her powerful legs to launch projectiles at enemies by kicking them. In the final melee against Manny's herd, she battles Manny herself, until she is blasted away by Precious.

Silas

Silas is a petrel-like blue-footed booby who usually scouts out for trouble ahead of the pirates. Silas informs Captain Gutt of Manny and his herd's presence, claiming that their raft was a huge bounty ripe for the taking. Silas later attacks Manny personally while the mammoth is escaping the hyrax island, but Manny bats him away with his trunk. In the final battle, Silas launches Gupta at Manny's face to distract him.

Squint

Squint is a Palaeolagus. He makes his first appearance in the second part of Scrat's Continental Crack-up. He is overconfident, somewhat psychotic, and dislikes being called adorable; he is berated many times by Gutt and Shira for trying to assume authority over the crew. Squint holds a rivalry with Shira, which reaches its climax when Squint becomes Gutt's new first mate after Gutt insults Shira for failing to kill Manny, Sid, Diego and Granny. In the final battle, Squint attempts to attack Shira as she is trying to free Ellie, but Shira mocks Squint's 'adorable nose', which agitates him and allows Ellie to stomp on him.

Squint later resurfaces in Ice Age: The Great Egg-Scapade where he wants revenge on the Herd for what happened to Captain Gutt, but he gets defeated by Sid and then he falls in a Crash and Eddie's trap for April's Fools.

Dobson

Dobson is a Metridiochoerus, who speaks in growls, oinks, and other pig noises (although he appeared to be singing along with the crew in the "Master of the Seas" musical sequence). He teams up with Raz in firing the cannons, loading them with chunks of ice for Raz to fire with her powerful kangaroo legs, and leaps down onto the heroes's ship with her to corner Manny. Dobson later takes part in the final battle, fighting Crash and Eddie "rodeo-style", and is able to charge into Manny and knock him into the other ship along with Shira. However, Dobson was blasted away by Precious along with the rest of the pirate crew.

Gupta

Gupta is a Bengali badger whose fur pattern on his back resembles a skull and crossbones, allowing the crew to use him as their pirate flag. He is shown to be somewhat cowardly, wishing to fly the white colors of his underbelly when the pirate ship was being destroyed. In the climax of the film, Gupta and Flynn corner Sid and Granny, but are scared off by Granny's pet whale Precious. Gupta is later dropped onto Manny's face by Silas, distracting the mammoth long enough for Dobson to attack him and to corner the herd. However, Gupta and the rest of the crew are blasted away by Precious.

Ethan

Ethan is a teenage woolly mammoth who takes a liking to Peaches, Manny and Ellie's teenage daughter, and becomes her love interest later. He is a thrill-loving teenager who is open-minded to Peaches being part of his group, and may have returned her affections. But he is shown to be shallow when he tells Peaches to stop hanging around Louis. When Peaches sees she has hurt her friend's feelings, and that Ethan and his group are lacking in common sense, she decides to leave. Ethan rudely remarks that "it's bad enough her family is half-possum", angering Peaches. Ethan, unlike his posse, seems to be at least partially rational, and might have felt guilt from hurting Peaches' feelings.

After Louis helps to save Peaches, Ethan and his group are impressed by his bravery. He asks to hang around with him and Peaches, to which Louis accepts.

Steffie

Steffie is a teenager woolly mammoth who is the alpha girl of the Valley's popular crew. Her friends, Katie and Meghan, are always in agreement with her. She does all that she can to keep any other girls away from Ethan, which is why she dislikes and insults Peaches. She is the sassy leader of the Brat Pack. Although she is rude and unkind, she can be sweet when she is with Ethan; when Louis and Peaches show their bravery fighting Gutt, she begins to warm up to them.

Katie and Meghan

Katie and Meghan are teenage woolly mammoths who are two of the first-rate members of the Valley's popular crew. Katie and Meghan are always in agreement with what Steffie says, and they do everything that Steffie does or asks. To Steffie, Katie is likely more important than Meghan, as they sometimes leave Meghan alone. Katie is known as the gossip girl of the Brat Pack.

Sid's Family

Sid is surprised by the return of his dysfunctional relatives who had abandoned him in the first film as they have a tendency to abandon him at specific points. His family consist of:

 Milton - Sid's father. He is kind of slow as Eunice would have to slap Milton to remind him to pretend to miss Sid.
 Eunice - Sid's melodramatic mother. She is not a good mother and tends to bump Marshall aside when he gets in her way.
 Marshall - Sid's sarcastic 20-year-old brother with a dwarfish appearance.
 Uncle Fungus - Sid's hygienically-challenged uncle who sports moss and fungus on his fur.

They dump their eighty-year-old Granny for Sid to take care of. Believing something was happening, the family left the land; shortly thereafter, the Pangaea supercontinent begun to fragment.

Despite how his family had abandoned him, Sid was very enthusiastic to see them and still loved them. Eunice seemed to care for her son, as she said she was worried about him when they were separated. When Sid replies that he thought they abandoned him, Marshall replies coldly that they did, but Eunice insists they were still worried about him and prompts her husband to insist they did. When Eunice instructed Sid to show Granny around, she quickly shows herself to be as cruel as the rest of Sid's family who leave hastily without looking back. Milton adds that Granny was simply "dead weight". Their current status is unknown.

In The Ice Age Adventures of Buck Wild, Ellie's narration about the Herd coming together had her mentioning that Eunice moved away and didn't leave him a forwarding address

Ariscratle

Ariscratle is a saber-toothed squirrel that lives on Scratlantis. He welcomes Scrat to Scratlantis when he washes up. When Scrat starts to go after the large acorn, Ariscratle tries to talk him out of lifting it to no avail. Ariscratle went down with Scratlantis as the surrounding area was turned into the first desert.

His name is a pun on the Greek philosopher Aristotle.

Sirens

Sirens are shape-shifting fish-like creatures that lay on rock outcrops near the ocean, where they lure in creatures by casting hallucinations of entities attractive to the creatures (such as loved ones, attractive potential mates, or even items such as Scrat's prized acorn). Scrat kills a siren when trying to bury it, leading the others to chase him. At the end of the film, one lures Captain Gutt and consumes him after assuming the form of a female Gigantopithecus.

They are loosely based on the Sirens of Greek mythology.

Precious

Precious is a 123-foot-long Livyatan with three rows of teeth. Precious was the pet of a ground sloth named Granny; Granny's family, especially Marshall, thought her senile for talking on about her "dead pet". But Precious was alive and had grown to an enormous size. When Granny, along with her grandson Sid and his friends Manny and Diego, were confronted at a cliff overhanging the ocean by a number of pirates, Granny called Precious, who rose up out of the water, opened her mouth, and allowed Granny to walk in along with Sid (who was disgusted at the smell inside the whale). Later, Granny and Sid use her like a submarine to fight with the pirates.

Large, even for a whale, Precious was the beloved pet of Granny, who was always seen throwing food into the ocean when she was near it. Precious was loyal to Granny, such that Granny could step inside the whale's mouth and commandeer her like a submarine. Her blowhole was shown as being capable of delivering a nasty attack to the pirates, and she was able to swallow Manny to prevent him from falling in the sea.

Hyraxes

Hyraxes have only been seen in Ice Age: Continental Drift, Ice Age: Collision Course, and The Ice Age Adventures of Buck Wild.

They are first seen being forced to work as slaves by Captain Gutt, as they are used to load Gutt's treasure onboard and are even used to swab the deck as part of a mop.

Manny, Sid and Diego encounter the hyraxes that were not enslaved during a short trek on a deserted island in the jungle. Though somewhat wary of the visitors, the hyraxes quickly warm up to the Sub-Zero Heroes. Manny feels that, if the hyraxes helped them, they could defeat the pirates; unfortunately, the hyraxes are unable to comprehend English and misinterpret Manny's request as asking for food. Eventually, Sid is able to communicate to them that an alliance is necessary if the other hyraxes are to be freed and the pirates are to be defeated, much to the surprise of Manny and Diego. The lead hyrax (distinguished by his bushy eyebrows, lighter fur coloration, and lower voice tone), who hates Gutt with a passion, rallies his forces and decides to help the herd, much to the herd's delight.

During the attack on the pirates, the lead hyrax spearheads a cavalry attack, followed by a dive bombing rescue, which is a diversion used to trick the pirates into leaving the slave hyraxes and their ship unguarded while the herd frees the captives and overtakes the ship. The enslaved hyraxes take an immense liking to Diego after he frees them.

As the heroes escape on Gutt's new ship, the hyraxes fashion small ice boats, which they use to sail away to a new home in South America, taunting the pirates as they leave.

The hyraxes are last seen in South America, where they have made a new home and have even carved a hyrax-sized replica of the Statue of Liberty, welcoming the other animals.

Pirate rats

A number of  pirate rats (or pie-rats) made their homes on the "ship" of Captain Gutt, actually a giant iceberg carved into a seaworthy vessel with Gutt at its helm and a number of other animals as its crew. The rats subsided more or less well off with Gutt on board, though one of them suffered Gutt's annoyance when it was caught mocking his apish movements and thus picked up by the ape and flung off the ship.

Later, once a number of seaborne mammals accidentally broke down Gutt's vessel, the rats abandoned ship, escaping into the waters below, with at least one pushed out forcefully by Scrat, another mammal taken hostage by Gutt.

Giant crab

The giant crab is a minor character in the fourth film. The giant crab was seen aboard Manny, Diego and Sid's "ship" during a storm. After trying to escape, Sid was trapped on the edge of the floating land. The crab tried to attack him, but it noticed a giant wave heading towards them; Sid, noticing it too, clutched onto the crab's leg in a terrified trance. As soon as the wave was gone, Sid tried to thank the giant crab for saving his life, but was horrified to see only its leg remaining, with leg then being blown away by the wind.

Appearing in Ice Age: Collision Course

Dino-Bird Family
The Dino-Bird Family is a family of Bird-like Dromaeosaurid Dinosaurs that first appear in Ice Age: Collision Course. They make a living stealing eggs from other dinosaurs. The Dino-Bird Family take their leave from the dinosaur habitat underground where they pursue Buck when he steals back one of the Triceratops eggs that they have stolen. While they were determined to stop Buck at the time he was assisting the Herd from combating the threat of an asteroid, they end up giving up on targeting Buck and help the Herd in stopping the asteroid and later attended Peaches' wedding.

Gavin

Gavin is a tough-as-nails and misguided dromaeosaur who is part of an extended family of "flying birds".

Gertie

Gertie is a posh and foxy dromaeosaur who is part of an extended family of "flying birds".

Roger

Roger is a freaky and cowardly young dromaeosaur who is part of an extended family of "flying birds."

Shangri Llama

Shangri Llama is the spiritual leader of Geotopia. He is very flexible, and loves to do Yoga. His personality is very laid back, but can be easily stressed out.

Teddy

Teddy is a fitness-obsessed Palaeolagus at age 326 who is a resident of Geotopia.

Francine

Francine is a fair-and-square, high-pitched voiced Megalonyx and is Sid's ex-girlfriend.

When Sid attempts to finally propose to her, she unlikely turns down his offer, leaving him confused and rejected.

Neil deBuck Weasel

Neil deBuck Weasel is a space astronomer weasel who lives in Buck's mind and helps The Herd in searching for a way to stop the coming "extinction". He also acts as the narrator of the entire film and is a fourth wall breaker.

Note: He is based on real live astronomer Neil deGrasse Tyson, who also plays his voice and served as a scientific consultant for the movie.

Bubbles and Misty

Bubbles and Misty are "minicorns" who reside in Geotopia.

Appearing in The Ice Age Adventures of Buck Wild

Orson

Orson is the main antagonist of The Ice Adventures of Buck Wild. He is a humanoid Protoceratops with a Triceratops-like frill, spikes on his tail, and a large brain extending from the back of his head.

Zee

Zee is a supporting character in The Ice Adventures of Buck Wild. A striped polecat, she was a former, and the only other surviving member besides Buck, of Buck's superhero team. A running gag is that Crash and Eddie try to figure out what "Zee" stands for.

Appearing in Ice Age: A Mammoth Christmas

Prancer

Prancer is a flying reindeer character appearing in the special.

He first appears where he saves Sid, Peaches, Crash, and Eddie during a white out. When the rest of the herd caught up, Prancer accidentally caused an avalanche which ended up destroying Santa Claus' workshop and the toys that he built. After the herd, Prancer, and the local Mini-Sloths repaired the toys and the workshop, Prancer was unable to pull Santa Claus' sleigh. This results in Prancer summoning his family to come help where they promise to help Santa Claus on Christmas.

Santa Claus

Santa Claus is a character in the special.

Santa Claus is a magical human that brings children presents on Christmas. He has built thousands of toys and was about to deliver them when the impending avalanche caused by the characters destroyed the toys and his workshop. Those that were responsible inspired Santa Claus to start the naughty list. The herd alongside Prancer and the local Mini-Sloths were able to make it up to Santa Claus by working to save Christmas where they rebuilt the toys and Santa Claus' workshop. With the Mini-Sloths agreeing to work for Santa Claus, Prancer was able to round up his fellow reindeer in order to pull Santa Claus' sleigh.

Mini-Sloths
The Mini-Sloths are Christmas elves in this special.

Appearing in Ice Age: The Great Egg-Scapade

Ethel

Ethel is a female Gastornis who is among the parents that entrusted Sid to watch over her eggs.

Condor Mom

The Condor Mom is a female Condor who is among the parents that entrusted Sid to watch over her eggs.

Clint

Clint is a friendly rabbit who appears in the special. He is the twin brother of Squint and becomes the Easter Bunny.

Gladys Glypto

Gladys Glypto is a Glyptodon who is among the parents that entrusted Sid to watch over her egg.

Cholly Bear

Cholly Bear is a chalicothere who is among the parents that entrusted Sid to watch over his egg. In his case, he adopted an egg.

He previously appeared in the second film where Manny mistook his flatulence for mammoth calls.

Appearing in Ice Age: Scrat Tales

Baby Scrat

Baby Scrat is an illegitimate son of Scrat. He and Scrat are fighting over an acorn for nothing until his father died of old age.

Notes

References

Characters
Lists of fictional animals by work
Fictional prehistoric characters
Lists of animated film characters
Animated characters by series
Lists of fictional animals in animation
Lists of Disney animated film characters
Ice Age